Hunter is a police drama television series starring Fred Dryer as "Sgt. Rick Hunter" and Stepfanie Kramer as "Sgt. Dee Dee McCall", which ran on NBC from 1984 to 1991. However, Kramer left after the sixth season (1990) to pursue other acting and musical opportunities. The seventh season saw Hunter partnered with two different women officers. The titular character, Sgt. Rick Hunter, was a wily, physically imposing, and often rule-breaking homicide detective (badge# 089 in the early seasons, badge# 378 in later seasons) with the Los Angeles Police Department. The "Pilot" TV movie premiered on September 18, 1984, with the regular series starting 10 days later. The show ended on April 26, 1991, after seven seasons. There are a total of 153 episodes, spanning seven years (1984–1991) of the show's run.

Created by Frank Lupo and Stephen J. Cannell, the show in its early episodes played as television's answer to Dirty Harry. Even after the show's violence was toned down during the second season in hopes of boosting ratings, Hunter and McCall still managed to resolve many cases by shooting the perpetrators dead.

The show's executive producer during the first season was Stephen J. Cannell, whose company produced the series.

Original series

Main cast
 Fred Dryer ... Det. Sgt. Richard "Rick" Hunter
 Stepfanie Kramer ... Det. Sgt. Dee Dee McCall (1984-1990)
 Charles Hallahan ... Capt. Charles "Charlie" Devane (1986-1991). Captain Devane joined the cast in the first episode of the third season, "Overnight Sensation". He replaced Captain Wyler and was a more confrontational boss, although not as hostile as earlier Captains. Captain Devane remained for the rest of the series.

Supporting cast
The supporting cast of the series changed over the course of the series, occasionally within the same season.
 John Amos ... Capt. Dolan (1984-1985). Captain Dolan became the supervisor of Homicide Division starting in the sixth episode of the first season, "Legacy". Amos remained for the duration of the first season.
 Courtney Barilla ... Allison Novak (1991)
 Richard Beauchamp ... Carlos (Asst. M.E.) (1985-1987). Debuted in the second season as an assistant medical examiner, often providing insight for Hunter and McCall.
 Arthur Rosenberg ... Capt. Lester D. Cain/Commander Lester D. Cain (1984/1987). Only appeared in the first few episodes of the first season as Captain Cain, later promoted to Commander. Appeared in Season 4, as Commander Cain in "City of Passion", parts 1 and 2. Michael Cavanaugh appeared as Captain Lester Cain in the TV Pilot, but did not appear in further episodes.
 Perry Cook ... Barney Udall (Coroner) (1986-1990). Appeared in the two-part episode "The Beautiful and the Dead" as a county coroner. Occasionally appeared in later episodes.
 Bruce Davison ... Captain Wyler (1985–87). Replaced John Amos as Hunter and McCall's supervisor Homicide Captain Wyler beginning in the first episode of the second season. Was promoted to Deputy Chief by the beginning of the third season and was replaced by Captain Charles "Charlie" Devane.
 Darlanne Fluegel ...  Off. Joanne Molenski (1990-1991). Killed off midway through season 7.
 Stanley Kamel ... Gov. Agent Brad Wilkes (Occasional) (1987-1988)
 Lauren Lane ...  Police Sgt. Chris Novak (1991). Molenski's replacement as Hunter's partner.
 Garrett Morris ...  Arnold "Sporty" James (1986-1989). Debuted in the episode "The Return of Typhoon Thompson". Became a guest star informant in later appearances, beginning with the first episode of the third season.
 John Shearin ...  Lt. Ambrose Finn (1985–88). Debuted in the episode "Blow-Up" as Homicide Lieutenant Ambrose Finn, a less confrontational immediate supervisor for Hunter and McCall. Killed off at the end of season 4.
 James Whitmore, Jr. ... Sgt. Bernie Terwilliger (1984-1986). An ambitious but incompetent detective. A regular cast member in the first season, the character moved to the Internal Affairs division during the second season and was an occasional guest star.

Guest appearances

Season One

Season Two

Season Three

Season Four

Season Five

Season Six

Season Seven

Revival series

Main cast
 Fred Dryer ... Lt. Richard "Rick" Hunter
 Stepfanie Kramer ... Sgt. Dee Dee McCall

Supporting cast
 Mike Gomez ... Capt. Roberto Gallardo
 Michelle Gold ... Off./Det. Cynthia Monetti
 Sid Sham ... Off./Det. Sid Keyes
 Meredyth Hunt ... Det. Krysta Carson (TV Movies Only) (2002-2003)
 Frank Grillo ... Det. Terence Gillette (TV Movies Only) (2002-2003)
 Kenneth Taylor ... Off. Mueller (TV Movies Only) (2002-2003)
 Robert Crow ... Off. Wilcher (TV Movies Only) (2002-2003)
 Alex Mendoza ... Det. Anthony Santiago (Series Episodes Only) (2003)

References

Lists of American crime television series characters
Lists of action television characters
Lists of American drama television series characters